Tess Wiley (born November 5, 1974) is an American singer-songwriter.

Early life
Tess Wiley was born in Dallas, Texas in 1974 to a Christian  family. Her mother was a poet Kathryn Wiley while her father was a musician Fletch Wiley, one of The Disciples. Tess's childhood was rather rough, she used to travel a lot from Houston to Seattle to San Francisco then back to Houston... She showed an interest in music and songwriting from an early age, adding "Create in Me a Clean Heart" and "Tender Shepherd" to her repertoire at the age of two. She began to play the piano at the age of five, then the violin at 12, and the guitar at 14. She wanted to make her musical style along the lines of hard rock guitarist Slash, but riffing soon gave way to contemplative songwriting. She spent her high school years singing in the band Nothing in Return while studying classical piano at the High School for the Performing and Visual Arts in Houston, Texas where she sang along with Mariah Carey and Whitney Houston.

Career

Sixpence None the Richer 
In 1995, Wiley joined the band Sixpence None the Richer on their European and American tours and wrote a mini-album Tickets For A Prayer Wheel as well as "Disconnect" for their second record, This Beautiful Mess. Wiley left the band shortly after the American tour in 1996. When Sixpence reunited in 2007, Wiley rejoined in 2008 and performed several shows including the European tour, but left shortly thereafter.

Solo career 
After her departure from Sixpence, she began recording under the name "Splendora" but had to abandon it because it was in copyright violation with the New York City group of the same name. She adopted "Phantasmic" name for her group when she was still dating Chris Colbert, who was a singer in Fluffy. Together, they agreed to change the name of the band to Xtra Fluffy and compiled a few songs along with Zachary Gresham of Southern Hymns. Eventually, she formed her own band, called Tess Wiley and Her Orchestra.

She also lent her vocals to Velour 100 on the album Of Color Bright in 1997 and the following year recorded an album I Light Up Your Life as well as Debby Boone's You Light Up My Life. She also appeared in the Misfits' I Turned Into A Martian and sang many songs from the 70s and 80s of such singers as Michael Jackson, Pat Benatar, Sam Phillips, Nazareth and Level 42 among others. In the end of 2001 Tess had released her first album called Rainy Day Assembly which she recorded along with Gerry Leonard and David Bowie between June 1999 and January 2001 while living in New York City. She also was responsible for hiring a producer, Paul Bryan, who periodically invites her to town when he is with Aimee Mann.

In 2003, Tess had relocated to Giessen, Germany where she had formed a band with Tim Potzas, Christian Weiss and Christian Pfaff. In 2004 her Not Quite Me album was launched in Germany which was her first attempt at recording alone and was released by Tapete Records. In 2007 she agreed with Tapete to release her another album, called Superfast Rock n' Roll Played Slow. In 2010 Tess had formed a duo band along with Elo von Knorre, whom she met at the church. During those times, she also written a German song "Licht Leuchte Auf" and had translated "My Fortress And My Shield", an inspiration of Psalm 42 from her Not Quite Me record. In 2011 she had sung for the Houses And Homes of Gregor McEwan and the same year recorded songs "How Much I Love You", "Rescue Me" and "Good, What We've Got".
In 2013 her album Little Secrets was released by Nordpol which featured her song "Tornados".

Personal life
Wiley was married to Christian Roth, a photo-journalist. Her brother, Gabriel Wiley, is the drummer in the emo band Mineral.

Discography
Rainy Day Assembly (Effanel, 2001)
Not Quite Me (Tapete, 2004)
Superfast Rock n' Roll Played Slow (Tapete, 2007)
Little Secrets (Nordpol, 2013)
Femme Sole (What we call Records, 2018)

Sidewoman
With Steev Richter
Beloved (Steev Richter, 2016)
With Velour 100
Of Color Bright (Tooth and Nail, 1997)

References

1974 births
Living people
Alternative rock guitarists
American alternative rock musicians
American expatriates in Germany
21st-century American women singers
21st-century American women guitarists
21st-century American guitarists
People from Dallas
Musicians from Dallas
Tapete Records artists
21st-century American singers